The Philippine House Committee on Ethics and Privileges, or House Ethics and Privileges Committee is a standing committee of the Philippine House of Representatives.

Jurisdiction 
As prescribed by House Rules, the committee's jurisdiction is on the duties, conduct, rights, privileges and immunities, dignity, integrity and reputation of the House of Representatives of the Philippines and its members.

Members, 18th Congress

See also 
 House of Representatives of the Philippines
 List of Philippine House of Representatives committees

References

External links 
House of Representatives of the Philippines

Ethics and Privileges
Ethics organizations